The women's madison competition at the 2019 European Games was held at the Minsk Velodrome on 30 June 2019.

Results
120 laps (30 km) were raced with 12 sprints.

References

Women's madison